This is a list of singers from Indonesia.

A 
Agnez Mo - international singer
Acha Septriasa – female pop singer and actress
Afgan – male pop/R&B/soul singer, actor
Ahmad Albar – rock musician and vocalist
Ahmad Dhani – pop/rock singer-songwriter, composer and record producer, owner of Republik Cinta Management.
Amara – soul/country singer
Anggun – Indonesian and French naturalized singer-songwriter, world's best selling Indonesian artist, first Indonesian who breaks worldwide music charts.
Ari Lasso – pop/rock singer, former Dewa 19 vocalist
Ayu Ting Ting – dangdut singer
Ashanty - Indonesian singer
Aurel Hermansyah - Indonesian singer and actress

B 
Benyamin Sueb – Betawi traditional singer, actor
Brian Imanuel - Rapper, First Indonesian rapper who breaks worldwide chart
Broery Marantika – tenor singer
Billy Surya Dilaga — Indonesian singer-songwriter
Bunga Citra Lestari – pop singer and actress

C 
Camelia Malik – dangdut female singer
Chrisye – pop/soul/progressive rock male singer
Cinta Laura – electropop female singer, dancer, and actress
Cita Citata – female dangdut singer and actress
Citra Scholastika – Indonesian female pop/jazz singer, runner-up Indonesian Idol, season 6

D 
Dewi Lestari – Indonesian singer-songwriter and best selling author
Dewi Persik – Dangdut singer
Dewiq – rock singer and songwriter
Dewi Sandra – pop/R&B singer, dancer, actress and model
Didi Kempot – campursari singer

E 
Ebiet G Ade – country/ballad/folk male singer
Elvy Sukaesih – Dangdut female diva/Queen of Dangdut Indonesia
Eros Djarot – pop Male Singer-Songwriter
Evie Tamala – dangdut female singer

F 
Fatin Shidqia – Indonesian pop singer, winner of the first season of X Factor Indonesia
Fariz RM – Indonesian pop music maestro
Francois Mohede – soul/country singer

G 
Gale Ligiro - pop singer and songwriter
Glenn Fredly – pop/R&B/jazz musician
Gita Gutawa – pop/teen pop/classical female singer.
Gombloh – pop singer and songwriter

H 
 Harry Roesli – avant garde musician

I 
Indra Lesmana – jazz musician, singer, songwriter and record producer
Indah Dewi Pertiwi – Indonesian pop singer, dancer, model
Inul Daratista – Dangdut female singer
Irwansyah – pop singer and actor
Iwa K – male rapper
Iwan Fals – folk/country/ballad male singer
Isyana Sarasvati – female pop/RnB/jazz/soul singer, pianist, and songwriter

J 
Jockie Soerjoprajogo – formerly of God Bless, keyboarder and songwriter
Joy Tobing – winner of Indonesian Idol season 1
Julia Perez – Dangdut singer, actress, and model for FHM and Maxim France

L
Lilis Suryani
Lyodra Ginting

M 
 Marshanda – pop/R&B female singer and actress
 Maudy Ayunda – female singer-songwriter and actress
 Melky Goeslaw – pop male singer
 Melly Goeslaw – pop/R&B/dance singer-songwriter, record producer
 Mike Mohede – Indonesian singer, winner of Indonesian Idol season 2
 Mulan Jameela – Indonesian pop singer and formerly of duo Ratu
 Mimi Mariani – Indonesian tradisional singer, actress

N 
 Nafa Urbach – Indonesian rock/dangdut singer
 Naura Ayu
 Nicky Astria – Indonesian rock singer
 Nike Ardilla – Indonesia rock
 Niki – Indonesian R&B singer-songwriter
 Norazia
 Novita Dewi – Indonesian pop/rock/gospel singer, grand champion of Astana International Song Festival 2005 in Kazakhstan

O
Once – pop singer

P 
Pane Irma – pop female singer
Pinkan Mambo – pop/R&B female singer. Formerly of duo Ratu

R 
Rainych – J-Pop/City Pop female singer
Rhoma Irama – dangdut male singer-songwriter, musician, actor, politician; recognised as The King of Dangdut
Rini Wulandari – Indonesian pop/R&B singer, winner of Indonesian Idol season 4
Rizky Febian – male pop, R&B, soul & jazz singer, songwriter, son of the comedian Sule
Rossa – Indonesian pop/R&B/soul female singer and the most popular regional (Indonesia, Singapore, Malaysia) artist
Ruth Sahanaya – pop/R&B/classic female singer
 Revo Marty – pop/R&B/soul/Jazz male singer
Raisa Andriana – pop/R&B/soul/jazz female singer
Rich Brian – Indonesian rapper

S 
Sandhy Sondoro – pop/adult contemporary male singer and winner of the 2009 International Contest of Young Pop Singer New Wave in Latvia
Shanty – female pop/R&B/soul/jazz singer, dancer and actress
Sherina Munaf – female pop singer-songwriter and former most popular child star
Sheryl Sheinafia – female pop/soul singer
Syahrini – female pop singer, songwriter, actress and dancer

T 
Tantowi Yahya – Indonesian country singer, TV presenter and member of Indonesian house of representative
Terryana Fatiah – Indonesian pop female singer
Titi DJ – pop/R&B/soul female singer, Indonesian idol judge and former of Indonesian representative at Miss World 1983
Titiek Puspa – pop singer
Tulus – male pop, soul and jazz singer

V 
Vidi Aldiano – pop male singer
Vina Panduwinata – pop female singer
Virgoun

W 
Wafda Saifan — pop singer
Waljinah – keroncong singer

Y 
Yuni Shara – pop female singer
Yura Yunita – pop female singer

References

 
Lists of singers by nationality
Singers
 
Lists of musicians by nationality